Feast and Famine is a 1914 American silent short drama film directed by Sydney Ayres. Starring B. Reeves Eason, William Garwood, Harry von Meter, Jack Richardson and Vivian Rich.

External links

1914 drama films
1914 films
Silent American drama films
American silent short films
American black-and-white films
1914 short films
Films directed by Sydney Ayres
1910s American films